Homan-Gerard House and Mills is a historic home and mill complex located at Yaphank in Suffolk County, New York.  It is composed of a large Federal-style residence (built about 1790), four contributing related support buildings, and six contributing related archaeological sites.  The house is a -story frame residence with a three-bay facade, gambrel roof, center chimney, and kitchen wing.  Also on the property are three small sheds and a large 2-story, late-19th-century barn. Archaeological remains include that of the J. P. Mills Store and Homan-Gerard saw mill and grist mill.

It was added to the National Register of Historic Places in 1988. Across from Yaphank Avenue is the Robert Hawkins Homestead

References

 

Houses on the National Register of Historic Places in New York (state)
Archaeological sites in New York (state)
Federal architecture in New York (state)
Houses completed in 1790
Houses in Suffolk County, New York
National Register of Historic Places in Suffolk County, New York
1790 establishments in New York (state)